Twylight is an album by pianist Geri Allen recorded in early 1989 and released on the German Minor Music label.

Reception 

AllMusic awarded the album 4 stars stating "This is a stunningly beautiful recording marking a distinct progression for Allen, and her complete awareness of the world at large. It might take several listenings to get used to, but the ultimate reward of this high artistic achievement is limitless".

Pianist and composer Ethan Iverson wrote "the compositional integrity is striking," and commented: "Twylight has a concentrated offering of Allen's odd meter vamps that feel old and fresh at the same time. Over those vamps Allen plays pretty chords, bluesy melodies, or jagged shapes. Everyone does this today, but at the time it was rousing call to arms."

Track listing
All compositions by Geri Allen
 "When Kabuya Dances" – 8:42
 "Shadow Series" – 6:06
 "Skin" – 1:43
 "A Place of Power" – 4:10
 "Twylight" – 1:11
 "Stop the World" – 4:06
 "Wood" – 2:36
 "Little Wind" – 4:22
 "Dream Time" – 3:44
 "Blue" – 4:11
 "Black Pools" – 4:29

Personnel 
Geri Allen – piano, synthesizer
Jaribu Shahid – bass (tracks 1–4, 6–9 & 11)
Tani Tabbal – drums, djembe (tracks 1, 3, 6–9 & 11)
Sadiq Bey – congas, percussion (tracks 1, 4, 7, 8 & 11)
Eli Fountain – percussion (tracks 7, 8 & 11)
Clarice Taylor Bell – vocals (tracks 2 & 11)

References 

1989 albums
Geri Allen albums
Instrumental albums